Ivy Tech Community College (Ivy Tech) is a public community college system in the U.S. state of Indiana. It is the state's public community college system and it has more than 40 locations. It is also the state's largest public postsecondary institution and the nation's largest individual accredited statewide community college system serving nearly 100,000 students annually on campus and online and another 60,000+ dual credit students in high schools throughout Indiana. It is accredited by the Higher Learning Commission.

History 
Ivy Tech was founded in 1963 as Indiana's Vocational Technical College in order to provide technical and vocational education for various industries and was rechartered as a system of vocational technical schools in 2005. The name "Ivy Tech" derives from an initialism (I.V. Tech) of the school's original name. The name was officially changed to Ivy Tech State College in 1995.

In 1999, Ivy Tech entered into a partnership with Vincennes University to form the Community College of Indiana. The partnership ended in 2005 and Ivy Tech was re-chartered as a system of community colleges and renamed Ivy Tech Community College of Indiana. In 2008, the Indiana University system agreed to shift most of its associate (2-year) degrees to the Ivy Tech Community College System.

In 2019, Ivy Tech entered into a partnership with the University of Virginia which will allow Ivy Tech undergraduates to complete their four-year degrees online at that university.

Academics 
Ivy Tech offers more than 150 programs and more than 100 transfer programs with in-state and out-of-state schools. Offerings vary by campus and are divided into seven schools:

 School of Business, Logistics and Supply Chain
 School of Public Affairs and Social Services
 School of Information Technology
 School of Arts, Sciences and Education
 School of Health Sciences
 School of Nursing
 School of Advanced Manufacturing, Engineering and Applied Science

Ivy Tech offers hands-on experience with some of the state’s most advanced technologies and training facilities, plus the convenience of more than 1,000 online classes, and the attention that comes with a small average class size of 22.[1]  Ivy Tech has transfer partnerships with four-year universities/colleges across Indiana, with several out-of-state partnerships as well.

Campuses

References

External links

Two-year colleges in the United States

Education in Evansville, Indiana
Education in Fort Wayne, Indiana
Education in Gary, Indiana
Valparaiso, Indiana
Educational institutions established in 1963
Education in Delaware County, Indiana
Education in Allen County, Indiana
Education in Clark County, Indiana
Universities and colleges in the Louisville metropolitan area
Education in Monroe County, Indiana
Education in Marion County, Indiana
Education in Bartholomew County, Indiana
Education in Elkhart County, Indiana
Education in Gibson County, Indiana
Education in Howard County, Indiana
Education in Kosciusko County, Indiana
Education in Lake County, Indiana
Education in Madison County, Indiana
Education in Perry County, Indiana
Education in Porter County, Indiana
Education in Putnam County, Indiana
Education in St. Joseph County, Indiana
Education in Tippecanoe County, Indiana
Education in Vigo County, Indiana
Education in Vanderburgh County, Indiana
Education in Wayne County, Indiana
1963 establishments in Indiana